Ieva Melanija Kibirkštis (born 2 April 1991) is a Canadian-raised Lithuanian football manager and a former player who played as a defender. She has been a member of the Lithuania women's national team.

Early life
Kibirkštis was raised in Pointe-Claire, Quebec.

References

1991 births
Living people
Women's association football forwards
Lithuanian women's footballers
Lithuania women's international footballers
College women's soccer players in the United States
Mount St. Mary's Mountaineers athletes
Lithuanian expatriate footballers
Lithuanian expatriate sportspeople in the United States
Expatriate women's soccer players in the United States
Soccer people from Quebec
People from Pointe-Claire
Canadian people of Lithuanian descent
Canadian expatriate women's soccer players
Canadian expatriate sportspeople in the United States
Lakers du Lac Saint-Louis players
Lithuanian expatriate sportspeople in Germany
Lithuanian expatriate sportspeople in Finland
Canadian expatriate sportspeople in Germany
Canadian expatriate sportspeople in Finland
Expatriate women's footballers in Germany
Expatriate women's footballers in Finland
Canadian women's soccer coaches
Canadian expatriate soccer coaches
Expatriate football managers in Sweden
Canadian expatriate sportspeople in Sweden
Lithuanian expatriate football managers